Casino Zodiak is a Kazakh-American gaming company which operates a number of casinos in Kazakhstan, Kyrgyzstan, Egypt, and Northern Cyprus.

Its first casino was introduced in 2002 in Almaty.

Locations include:
Aktobe, Kazakhstan – opened in September, 2003
Nur-Sultan, Kazakhstan – September, 2004
Pavlodar, Kazakhstan – June, 2005
Oskemen, Kazakhstan – June, 2006
 Kapchagay, Almaty Province, Kazakhstan  
Bishkek, Kyrgyzstan – May, 2007
Sharm el Sheikh, Egypt – December, 2007
Kyrenia, Cyprus – December, 2007
Issyk Kul, Kyrgyzstan – May, 2008
Kapchagay-Almaty Province, Kazakhstan – September, 2009

External links
Casino Zodiak

Companies of Kazakhstan